Soldier is a 1998 American science fiction action film directed by Paul W. S. Anderson, written by David Webb Peoples, and starring Kurt Russell, Jason Scott Lee, Jason Isaacs, Connie Nielsen, Sean Pertwee and Gary Busey. The film tells the story of a highly skilled and emotionally distant soldier who is left for dead, befriends a group of refugees, then faces his former superiors who are determined to eliminate them.

The film was released worldwide on October 23, 1998. Upon its release, Soldier received generally negative reviews, although many praised the action sequences and Russell's performance. The film was a box-office bomb, grossing $14 million worldwide against a production budget of $60 million.

Plot

In 1996, as part of a new military training program, a group of orphaned infants are selected at birth and raised as highly disciplined soldiers with no understanding of anything but military routine. They are trained to be ruthless professionals, and anyone considered physically or mentally unworthy is executed. The survivors are turned into ultimate fighting machines, but have no understanding of the outside world.

In 2036, Sgt. Todd 3465 is a hardened veteran and one of the original 1996 infants, but his unit is about to be replaced by a superior one, with the original unit likely to be deactivated. Colonel Mekum, leader of the original project, introduces a new group of genetically engineered soldiers, designed with superior physical attributes and a complete lack of emotion, except complete aggression.

Captain Church, the commander of Todd's unit, insists on testing the new soldiers' abilities against his own. One new soldier, Caine 607, easily defeats three of the original soldiers, but Todd gouges out Caine's eye before falling from a great height; the body of a dead soldier cushions his fall, and he is knocked unconscious. Mekum orders their bodies disposed of like garbage, declaring them obsolete, while the remaining older soldiers are demoted to menial support roles.

Dumped on Arcadia 234, a waste disposal planet, Todd limps toward a colony whose residents crash-landed there years earlier; as they were believed dead, no rescue missions have been attempted. Todd is sheltered by Mace and his wife Sandra. Though they try to make him welcome, Todd has difficulty adapting to the community due to his extreme conditioning and their conflict-free lives. While Todd develops a silent rapport with their mute son, Nathan, who had been traumatized by a snakebite as an infant, he soon begins to experience flashbacks from his time as a soldier and mistakes one of the colonists for an enemy, nearly killing him. To make matters worse, in a later conflict with a coiled snake, Todd forces Nathan to face it down and strike back to protect himself. His parents disapprove of the lesson, unsure of how to deal with Todd.

Fearful, the colonists expel Todd from the community. Experiencing strong emotion for the first time, Todd appears confused when he is overcome by loss and cries for the first time. A short time later, Mace and Sandra are almost bitten by a snake while they sleep, but they are saved by Nathan, who uses Todd's technique. Now understanding the value of Todd's lesson, they seek him to reintegrate him into the community, but the others resist.

The new genetically engineered soldiers arrive on the garbage planet, and, since the world is listed as uninhabited, Colonel Mekum decides to use the colonists' community as the target in a training exercise. The soldiers spot Mace and kill him just after he finds Todd. Though out-manned and outgunned, Todd's years of battle experience and superior knowledge of the planet allow him to return to the colony and kill the advance squad. Nervous that an unknown enemy force may be confronting them, Colonel Mekum orders the soldiers to withdraw and return with heavy artillery. Using guerrilla tactics, Todd outmaneuvers and defeats all of the remaining soldiers, including Caine 607, whom he defeats in vicious hand-to-hand combat.

Panicking, Mekum orders the transport ship's crew, composed of Todd's old squad, to set up and activate a portable doomsday device powerful enough to destroy the planet. He orders the ship to lift off, leaving the squad behind. When Captain Church objects, Mekum shoots him in cold blood. Before they can take off as planned, Todd appears, and his old comrades silently side with him over the army that has discarded them, and take over the ship. They leave Mekum and his aides on the planet and evacuate the remaining colonists. In an attempt to disarm the device, Mekum accidentally sets it off, killing him and his aides. Todd pilots the ship from Arcadia just ahead of the shockwave and sets course for the Trinity Moons, the colonists' original destination. He picks up Nathan and points to their new destination, while looking out upon the galaxy.

Cast

 Kurt Russell as Sergeant Todd "3465"
 Jesse Littlejohn as 8-year-old Todd
 Wyatt Russell as 11-year-old Todd
 Jason Scott Lee as Caine 607
 Jason Isaacs as Colonel Mekum
 Connie Nielsen as Sandra
 Sean Pertwee as Mace
 Jared & Taylor Thorne as Nathan
 Mark Bringelson as Lieutenant  Rubrick
 Gary Busey as Captain Church
 K. K. Dodds as Lieutenant  Sloan
 James R. Black as Riley
 Kyle Sullivan as Tommy
 Corbin Bleu as Johnny
 Sara Paxton as Angie
 Jesse D. Goins as Chester
 Mark De Alessandro as Goines
 Vladimir Orlov as Romero
 Carsten Norgaard as Green
 Duffy Gaver as Chelsey
 Brenda Wehle as Hawkins
 Michael Chiklis as Jimmy Pig
 Elizabeth Dennehy as Jimmy Pig's wife
 Paul Dillon as Slade
 Max Daniels as Red
 Paul Sklar as Melton 249
 Ellen Crawford as Ilona
 Conni Marie Brazelton as Eva
 Danny Turner as Omar
 Elizabeth Huett as Janice
 Jesse Littlejohn as Will
 Alexander Denk as Military Observer
 Jeremy Bolt as Enemy Soldier
 Greg Stechman as Trainee 101

Production

Development and writing
The script was 15 years old at the time of production.

Kurt Russell spoke only 104 words in the entire movie despite being in 85% of the scenes. During the first week of shooting he broke his left ankle, then the top of his right foot four days later, so the entire production needed to be rescheduled. The filmmakers first shot scenes involving Russell lying down, followed by scenes of Russell sitting, Russell standing but not moving, and so on.

Release

Home media
The DVD was released in Region 1 in the United States on March 2, 1999, and Region 2 in the United Kingdom on August 2, 1999, it was distributed by Warner Home Video. It was released as a double-sided disc, which included the widescreen version on one side, with full-screen on the other. Included on the disc was a film commentary. Soldier was released on Blu-ray for the first time in the U.S. on July 26, 2011.

Reception

Box office
Soldier grossed $14.6 million in the United States.

Critical response
The review aggregator website Rotten Tomatoes reported a 15% approval rating based on 53 reviews and an average rating of 3.8/10. The website's critical consensus reads, "A boring genre film and a waste of a good set." Audiences polled by CinemaScore gave the film an average grade of "B+" on an A+ to F scale.

Bruce Westbrook of the Houston Chronicle commented that "the action is handled fairly well, but it's routine, and there's no satisfaction in seeing Todd waste men who are no more bloodthirsty than he is." Lisa Schwarzbaum of Entertainment Weekly criticized the film's overuse of genre clichés, saying "any cliché you can dream up for a futuristic action movie, any familiar big-budget epic you can think to rip off, Soldier has gotten there first." Michael Wilmington of the Chicago Tribune described the film as "a big, clanging, brutal actioner in which we search the murk in vain for the sparks of humanity the moviemakers keep promising us." Lisa Alspector of the Chicago Reader found the film to be enjoyable, calling Russell's performance "persuasive" and saying "this appealing formulaic action adventure displays a lot of conviction in its not-too-flashy action scenes and a little levity in the gradual socialization of Russell's character." Similarly, Kevin Thomas of the Los Angeles Times gave the film a rating of 3.5 out of 5 and called it "a potent comic-book-style action-adventure."

Connection with Blade Runner franchise
Soldier was written by David Peoples, who co-wrote the script for the 1982 film Blade Runner. He considers Soldier to be a "spin-off sidequel"-spiritual successor to Blade Runner, seeing both films as existing in a shared fictional universe. The film obliquely refers to various elements of stories written by Philip K. Dick (who wrote the 1968 novel Do Androids Dream of Electric Sheep?, on which Blade Runner is based), or film adaptations thereof. A Spinner from Blade Runner can be seen in the wreckage on the junk planet in the film and Russell’s character is shown to have fought in the battles referenced in Roy Batty’s (Rutger Hauer) dying monologue: the Shoulder of Orion and Tannhäuser Gate.

References

External links

 
 
 
 

1998 films
1990s science fiction action films
Blade Runner (franchise)
American science fiction action films
American space adventure films
American dystopian films
1990s English-language films
Fictional military organizations
Films about genetic engineering
Films based on science fiction novels
Films set in 1996
Films set in the 2010s
Films set in 2036
Films set on fictional planets
Military science fiction films
Morgan Creek Productions films
Warner Bros. films
Films scored by Joel McNeely
Films directed by Paul W. S. Anderson
Films with screenplays by David Peoples
1990s American films
Films set in the 2030s